Tom H. Keeping (April 12, 1942 – June 10, 2020) was a Canadian politician. He served in the Legislative Assembly of Saskatchewan from 1991 to 1995, as a NDP member for the constituency of Nipawin. He died on June 10, 2020.

References

Saskatchewan New Democratic Party MLAs
1942 births
2020 deaths